Thomas Auguste Read Delay  (born 9 April 1959) is the chief executive of the Carbon Trust. He has served in that position since its formation in 2001. He was initially appointed by a joint committee of the UK Office of the Deputy Prime Minister and the Confederation of British Industry.

Tom Delay is a member of the UK Energy Research Partnership and chairs the advisory board of the MSc in Climate Change, Management & Finance at Imperial College London.  In 2011 he was appointed to the UK Offshore Wind Cost Reduction Task Force.

He was appointed a CBE by the Queen in the New Year's Honours 2018 for services to sustainability in business.

Tom Delay is a noted commentator on business issues arising from the impact of climate change

Tom Delay was educated at Lycée Français Charles de Gaulle, followed by the University of Southampton.

References 

21st-century English businesspeople
Commanders of the Order of the British Empire
Climate economists
English chief executives
Living people
1959 births